FC Zvezda Gorodishche was a Russian football team from Gorodishche, Volgograd Oblast. It played professionally from 1989 to 1996. Their best result was 2nd place in Zone 2 of the Russian Second Division in 1993.

Team name history
 1989–1991: FC Zvezda Gorodishche
 1992–1993: FC Zvezda-Rus Gorodishche
 1994–1996: FC Zvezda Gorodishche

External links
  Team history at KLISF

Association football clubs established in 1989
Association football clubs disestablished in 1997
Defunct football clubs in Russia
Sport in Volgograd Oblast
1989 establishments in Russia
1997 disestablishments in Russia